The Tramway Gas Station is a landmark former Enco service station in Palm Springs, California, United States, so named because of its location at the foot of Tramway Road, the lone road leading to the base of the Palm Springs Aerial Tramway. It was intended to be the first Palm Springs building visitors saw when approaching the city from the north via California State Route 111.

The building, with its distinctive, cantilevered, wedge-shaped canopy (referred to as a hyperbolic paraboloid on a historic marker mounted on the building) was built in 1965 and designed by Albert Frey and Robson C. Chambers. It is considered to be a prime example of modernist architecture.

The station had closed by the mid-1990s, and its fate was in doubt until its purchase by a private interest, who erected a wall around the property and converted it into an art gallery. The building was listed on the National Register of Historic Places in 2015. It is now operated by the Palm Springs Bureau of Tourism as the Palm Springs Visitor Center.

See also

 North Shore Beach and Yacht Club

References

External links

Palm Springs Visitor Center at the Palm Springs Bureau of Tourism website

Modernist architecture in California
International style architecture in California
Transport infrastructure completed in 1965
Buildings and structures in Palm Springs, California
Tourist attractions in Palm Springs, California
National Register of Historic Places in Riverside County, California
Transportation buildings and structures in Riverside County, California
Albert Frey buildings
1965 establishments in California
Gas stations on the National Register of Historic Places in California
Visitor centers in the United States
ExxonMobil buildings and structures
ExxonMobil history